Adolph Gustav Kiefer (June 27, 1918 – May 5, 2017) was an American competition swimmer, Olympic competitor, the last surviving gold medalist of the 1936 Summer Olympics and former world record-holder. He was the first man in the world to swim the 100-yard backstroke in under one minute. Kiefer was also an inventor and innovator of new products related to aquatics competition.

Early life and education 
Kiefer was born as a son of German immigrants in Chicago, Illinois, and there attended Roosevelt High School (1936). He then attended the University of Texas at Austin (1939), and Columbia College, Columbia University (1940).

Early record breaking 
Kiefer became the first man to break the one-minute mark in the 100-yard backstroke while competing as a 16-year-old in the Illinois High School Championships of 1935, swimming 59.8 seconds. His 1936 Illinois state championship backstroke time of 58.5 seconds was the Illinois state high-school record until 1960. On April 6, 1940, Kiefer set another world record, swimming the 100-yard backstroke in 57.9 seconds. He broke twenty-three records after breaking the one-minute backstroke mark. Kiefer set a world record for the 100-meter backstroke of 1:04.8 on January 18, 1936, at Brennan Pools in Detroit, Michigan.

Summer Olympics in Berlin
Eighteen-year-old Kiefer represented the United States at the 1936 Summer Olympics in Berlin, Germany. On August 14, Kiefer won the gold medal in the men's 100-meter backstroke. He set new Olympic records in the first-round heats (1:06.9), the second-round heats (1:06.8), and the event final (1:05.9). His Olympic Record would stand for over 20 years, finally broken by David Theile in the 1956 Summer Olympics.

Later swimming career 
Kiefer returned home a national hero, and began traveling with other U.S. Olympic medalists on a tour of Europe, China, Japan, and South America, during which he challenged other great swimmers in those locations to individual races.

In over 2,000 races, Kiefer lost only twice. At the National AAU swimming championship in April 1943, University of Michigan All-American swimmer Harry Holiday, Jr. finally went head-to-head with world-record holder Kiefer. Holiday beat him in the 150-yard backstroke at the AAU meet. The defeat was the first for Kiefer in eight years.

In his first two months of varsity competition, Holiday broke two of Kiefer's world records, lowering the 100-yard backstroke mark to 57 seconds and the 200-meter standard to 2:22.9. In August 1943, the NCAA also recognized Holiday as the holder of the new world record in the 150-yard backstroke with a mark of 1:31.5. Shortly thereafter, Kiefer was asked to audition for the role of "Tarzan", but answered the call of arms instead, joining the U.S. Navy.

In the navy 

Kiefer joined the U.S. Navy as a Chief Petty Officer in late 1943 and was initially assigned to the physical fitness and swimming division of the United States Navy's Bureau of Naval Personnel (BUPERS) as a Chief Athletics Specialist. When the Navy realized that it was losing more lives to drowning than to enemy bullets, Kiefer was appointed to a committee to set new guidelines for safety and training. He quickly moved through the ranks, becoming Officer in Charge of Swimming for the entire U.S. Navy, training over 13,000 navy swim instructors to do the "Victory backstroke", a term Kiefer coined himself. Victory backstroke was a simplified version of the modern backstroke that allowed novice swimmers to breathe easily (on their backs) while leveraging what Adolph considered to be a more buoyant stroke style for novice swimmers. Victory backstroke was performed with both arms underwater, sweeping down simultaneously (instead of using alternating arms), while using a freestyle kick. The American Red Cross would later add Victory Backstroke to their swim training protocols.

By the war's end, he had reached the rank of Lieutenant, Senior Grade.

Business career 
In 1947, he established Adolph Kiefer & Associates, Inc. in Chicago, which has provided swimmers with training, safety, and competition equipment. His Brother, Edward Kiefer, was responsible for the development of the nylon tank suit in 1948. and debuted the first nylon swimsuit supplied to the U.S. Olympic Swim Team—a marked improvement over the wool and cotton suits available at the time.

After observing seahorses during a scuba dive off the Florida keys, Adolph began to regard these marvelous creatures as his aquatic brethren and was further inspired to use seahorse imagery in company branding.

Kiefer subsequently devoted himself to community service, combining swimming and philanthropy in innovative ways. In the 1960s he worked with Mayor Richard J. Daley to build swimming-pools across the inner city of Chicago, providing the facilities needed for thousands of children to learn to swim. Kiefer actively supported Swim Across America, a nonprofit organization that raises funds for cancer research, and participated in SAA public swimming events well into his 70s and 80s.

Later life 
Kiefer was an "Honor Swimmer" member of the inaugural class inducted into the International Swimming Hall of Fame in 1965. In 1966 he patented the first design for a no-wave, non-turbulence racing lane.

In 2008 Kiefer celebrated his 90th birthday in Omaha at the 2008 U.S. Swimming Olympic Trials, where he awarded medals for the 200-meter backstroke. On June 27, 2012, he celebrated his birthday again in Omaha at the 2012 U.S. Swimming Olympic Trials—by awarding the medals for the 200-meter backstroke. In 2013 USA Swimming named Kiefer the "father of American swimming" in recognition of his contributions to American swimming.

On the morning of May 5, 2017, Kiefer died at home in Wadsworth, Illinois, at the age of 98.

Family 
In 1941, Adolph Kiefer married Joyce Kainer. Together, they had four children: sons Dale and Jack and daughters Kathy and Gail. Jack Kiefer married Shelley Beman and had a son (Robin Kiefer) and a daughter (Gretel Kiefer).

See also
 List of members of the International Swimming Hall of Fame
 List of Olympic medalists in swimming (men)
 List of University of Texas at Austin alumni

References

External links

Our Founder – Adolph Kiefer – Founder profile at Adolph Kiefer & Associates, Inc.
 1936 Olympian still gets a kick from swimming

1918 births
2017 deaths
American people of German descent
American male backstroke swimmers
United States Navy personnel of World War II
Olympic gold medalists for the United States in swimming
Swimmers from Chicago
Swimmers at the 1936 Summer Olympics
Texas Longhorns men's swimmers
United States Navy sailors
United States Navy officers
University of Texas at Austin alumni
Medalists at the 1936 Summer Olympics
Military personnel from Illinois
20th-century American inventors
History of science and technology in the United States
World record setters in swimming
Columbia College (New York) alumni